Ibrahim Ali ElSaid Nour El Din  (born 24 March 1979) is an Egyptian football referee.

Nour became a FIFA referee in 2014.

References

1979 births
Egyptian football referees
Living people